The November 1878 New Hampshire gubernatorial election was held on November 5, 1878. Republican nominee Nathaniel Head defeated Democratic nominee Frank A. McKean with 50.26% of the vote.

General election

Candidates
Major party candidates
Nathaniel Head, Republican
Frank A. McKean, Democratic

Other candidates
Warren G. Brown, Greenback
Asa S. Kendall, Prohibition

Results

References

1878
New Hampshire
Gubernatorial